The 2003-04 AFC Bournemouth season was the club's first season back in the English Second Division following promotion the previous year. During the 2003–04 English football season, Bournemouth participated in Division Two, the LDV Vans Trophy, the FA Cup, and the Football League Cup. Bournemouth finished 9th in Division Two and were eliminated from the FA Cup in the Second Round. Both the LDV Vans Trophy and League Cup were exited in the First Round. James Hayter scored the fastest league hattrick of all time when he scored three goals in 140 seconds during a 6–0 win over Wrexham.

Season squad

Left club during season

Competitions

Legend

Second Division

Results

League Cup

FA Cup

Football League Trophy

References 

A.F.C. Bournemouth
AFC Bournemouth seasons
English football clubs 2003–04 season